1978 – A Teen Night Out is a 2019 Indian Bollywood film, directed by Aziz Zee, produced by Kunal Shamshere Malla and Suresh Thomas, and co-produced by Manesha Chatarji, presented by Theatre King. The film features the TV actress Sonyaa and playback singer Abuzar Akhtar.

Plot
A Teen Night Out is a racy, supernatural, terrifying, suspense story of a NIGHT OUT at a film studio by a group of teens based in 1978. The film follows seven teenagers who find their lives in jeopardy after getting trapped in a haunted mansion.

Cast
 Yash Rajpara
 Apurva Godbole
 Gaurav Sharma
 Vaishnavi Kadam
 Rishabh Raj
 Muskaan Tomar
 Sunny Yadav
 Rohit Mugallu
 Maliha Malla
 Sonyaa Twinks
 Abuzar Akhtar
Rishabh raj

References
 https://www.imdb.com/name/nm9896839/

External links
Whizbliz  

 BookMyShow

2019 films
2010s Hindi-language films
Indian thriller films
2019 thriller films